More House is the Catholic chaplaincy for the University of York in Heslington, York. The building itself dates from the late 18th century. The chaplains were formerly Carmelite friars resident in the building, but since 2021 priests from York Oratory have been ministering to the chaplaincy. It is located on Main Street in Heslington, which is towards the south edge of "Campus West".  It is a Grade II listed building.

History
In the late 18th century, the house was constructed. From 1809 to 1814, Sydney Smith lived there while his rectory in Foston was being rebuilt. From 1869, the parish of St Paul's Church in Heslington had a vicar and the house later became a vicarage. At some point later, the house became owned by the Diocese of Middlesbrough and renamed More House after Saint Thomas More. In 1967, the Catholic chaplaincy was started at More House.

From 1995 to 2021 the Carmelites served as chaplains to the Catholic community of the University of York. The Carmelites previously worked in York from 1250 to 1538 at York Carmelite Friary, but they surrendered their friary during the Reformation.

In 2021, Oratorians from the Oratory Church of Saint Wilfrid in York were invited to minister to the chaplaincy, with Fr. Richard Duffield appointed as chaplain.

The chaplaincy is used to host meeting of the University of York Catholic Students' Society, which occur every week during term time on Thursdays.

See also
 York Oratory
 Petergate House

References

External links
 
University of York Catholic Chaplaincy
York Oratory

Grade II listed buildings in York
Roman Catholic chapels in England
Grade II listed churches in North Yorkshire
Religious organizations established in 1967
University and college chapels in the United Kingdom
University of York
Roman Catholic churches in York
18th-century establishments in England
History of York
History of Catholicism in England
Oratorian communities in the United Kingdom